The 2011–12 Lokomotiv Moscow season involved the club competing in Russian Premier League, Russian Cup and Europa League.

Season review

 1 December 2010 (pre-season): after finishing the 2010 season in the 5th place, Yuri Semin is fired, and Yuri Krasnozhan appointed as a new manager.
 14 May 2011: after 4–0 home victory vs Terek in Matchday 9 Lokomotiv climbs to the 1st place in the table, where remains after Matchday 10.
 27 May 2011: Lokomotiv loses home game 1–2 to Anzhi in Matchday 11 in the manner, considered by some viewers as odd, and is currently 5th, just 1 point behind leader.
 6 June 2011: Yuri Krasnozhan is sacked by FC Lokomotiv Moscow Council of Directors.
 26 June 2011: Vladimir Maminov, appointed as a caretaker manager after dismissal of Yuri Krasnozhan, loses his 3rd game of 5 in charge, leaving team in the 8th place.
 1 July 2011: José Couceiro signs 2-year-long contract as a new manager of Lokomotiv.
 17 July – 21 August 2011: first 7 matches with José Couceiro in charge (5 in the League, 1 in Russian Cup and 1 in Europa League) end with clean sheets (5 victories, goals 12–0).
 23 February: Lokomotiv is eliminated from Europa League after losing to Athletic Bilbao by away goals rule (2–1 at home, 0–1 away).
 21 March 2012: Lokomotiv is knocked out from Russian Cup after quarter-final defeat 0–4 vs Rubin held at neutral venue due to bad pitch conditions at Central Stadium (Kazan).
 1 April – 13 May 2012: no wins in last 8 games of season (5 defeats, goals 4–14).
 14 May 2014: club announces the end of contract with José Couceiro and appointment of Slaven Bilić as a new manager, following Bilić's decision to step down from the post of Croatia national side manager after Euro 2012.

Players

Transfers

Winter 2010–11

In:

Out:

Summer 2011

In:

Out:

Winter 2011–12

In:

Out:

Competitions

Legend

Russian Premier League

Results by matchday

Matches

Table

Russian Premier League – Championship group

Matches

League table

Russian Cup

Europa League

Play-off

Group stage

Lokomotiv progressed to the knock-out stage.

Knock-out stage

Squad statistics

Appearances and goals

|-
|colspan="14"|Players who left Lokomotiv on loan:

|-
|colspan="14"|Players who appeared for Lokomotiv who left during the season:

|}

Top scorers

Disciplinary record

Notes
Note 1: Rubin played their home game in Grozny due to bad pitch conditions in Kazan.

References

FC Lokomotiv Moscow seasons
Lokomotiv Moscow
Lokomotiv Moscow